John T. Stankey (born 1962) is an American businessman currently serving as CEO of AT&T Inc. and as a member of AT&T Inc.’s board of directors. He previously served as AT&T’s president and COO and was the former CEO of WarnerMedia. Stankey led AT&T's acquisition of DirecTV and Time Warner in 2015 and 2018, respectively. He assumed the CEO role of AT&T effective July 1, 2020, succeeding Randall L. Stephenson.

Early life and education
Stankey was raised in  Los Angeles, the youngest of three children. His father was an insurance underwriter and his mother was a housewife. In the 1980s, he graduated with a B.B.A. in Finance from Loyola Marymount University. In 1991, he earned an M.B.A. from UCLA.

Career
 
In 1985, Stankey took an entry-level position with Pacific Bell. which was acquired by SBC Communications in 1996. Stankey went on to serve as the Executive Vice President of Industry Markets beginning in 1998 became the Executive President of Industry Markets in 2000. In 2001 Stankey became the President and CEO of SBC Southwest.
Stankey served as CIO of the "new AT&T" after the merger of SBC with AT&T Corporation finalized in 2005, becoming the senior executive vice president and CTO for AT&T from 2008 to 2012, Stankey held various senior executive positions within the company and in January 2012, Stankey became the CSO and group president of AT&T.

Stankey took a seat on the board of directors for UPS in 2014 (a position he would hold until 2020).

In 2018, Stankey was named CEO of WarnerMedia which owns various media and film corporations, including Warner Bros., HBO, Turner Broadcasting System, and CNN. 
On October 1, 2019, Stankey became the COO of AT&T while continuing to serve as the CEO of WarnerMedia.

Michael Sainato, writing for The Guardian, noted that AT&T had "lobbied aggressively in favor of the 2017 Trump tax cuts", committing to significant job creation (7,000 new positions), as well as to capital investment on the order of US$ $ 1-billion, further noting the significant tax savings the legislation provided—US$ 21-billion at time of passage of the bill, and a further ca. US$ 3-billion annually thereafter (arising from the lower corporate tax rate). He goes on to note that AT&T had "eliminated more than 42,000 jobs" since the passage of the tax cut legislation, in the period before it began its June 2020 retail store closures. 

On April 1, 2020, AT&T announced that Stankey would be stepping down as CEO of WarnerMedia.  Former Hulu CEO Jason Kilar assumed the role effective May 1, 2020, reporting to Stankey. On July 1, 2020, Stankey replaced Randall L. Stephenson as CEO of AT&T Inc.

In February 2021, Stankey oversaw the sale of a third of AT&T’s stake in DirecTV to TPG Capital for $16.25 billion. AT&T had paid 48 billion ($67 billion including debt) to purchase DirecTV in 2015. Stankey also oversaw WarnerMedia’s sale to Discovery Inc. in May 2021, for $43 billion in cash, plus an estimated $59 billion in Discovery, Inc. stock. AT&T had paid $85 billion for WarnerMedia in 2018.

On April 30, 2021, AT&T announced that a nonbinding shareholder vote had rejected AT&T's executive compensation proposal by a slight majority. This came after reports that AT&T had "lost [US]$5.4 billion and cut thousands of jobs".

Compensation

Stankey received US$ 22.5-million in compensation during the 2019 fiscal year, and US$ 21-million during the following year.

References

1962 births
Media executives
American chief executives
American telecommunications industry businesspeople
Living people
Warner Bros. Discovery people
AT&T people